Amor a mil (Love to a Thousand) is a Colombian telenovela which starred Manolo Cardona, Patricia Vásquez, Luís Fernando Hoyos, Margarita Ortega, Hernando Casanova, Julio César Luna and Gloria Gómez. It was produced and broadcast on Caracol TV in 2001. This telenovela contains 124 episodes.

Cast
 Manolo Cardona .... John Héctor Afanador 
 Patricia Vásquez .... Alejandra Guerrero 
 Margarita Ortega .... Magnolia Guzmán 
 Luis Fernando Hoyos .... Gabriel Ferrara 
 Carlos Humberto Camacho .... Enrique Guerrero
 Julio César Luna .... Augusto Guerrero 
 Gloria Gómez .... Julia de Afanador 
 Hernando Casanova .... Vicente Secretario 
 Karen Martinez .... Diana McKenzie 
 Fernando Arévalo .... Roberto Gordillo 
 Patricia Polanco .... Mila de Ferrara 
 Javier Gnneco .... Manuel Guzmán 
 Consuelo Moure .... Miryam de Guerrero 
 Julián Román .... Kevin Abelardo McKenzie 
 Joavany Álvarez .... Camilo Yucatán 
 Claudia Arroyave .... Isabel Afanador
 Alejandra Dominguez Jurado .... Laisa
 John Ceballos .... Gerardo "Geraldine" 
 Julio Escallón .... Mario Francisco 'Pacho' Jaimes 
 Álvaro Lemmon .... Jesús McKenizie 
 Andrés Martínez .... Sebastián Yucatán 
 Luis Alfredo Velasco .... Gustavo
 Felipe Galorfe
 Lincoln Palomeque

External links
 Amor a mil at the Internet Movie Database

2001 telenovelas
Colombian telenovelas
2001 Colombian television series debuts
2001 Colombian television series endings
Spanish-language telenovelas
Caracol Televisión telenovelas
Television shows set in Bogotá